Brent Thales Berk (born June 27, 1949) is an American former competition swimmer and Olympic athlete.

Berk represented the United States at the 1968 Summer Olympics in Mexico City.  He advanced to the event final of the men's 400-meter freestyle, and finished in eighth place with a time of 4:26.0.

Berk was born in Eustis, Florida, and graduated from the Punahou School in Honolulu, Hawaii.  He attended Stanford University, where he swam for the Stanford Cardinal swimming and diving team in National Collegiate Athletic Association (NCAA) competition and was recognized as an All-American.

He was inducted into the Hawaii Swimming Hall of Fame in 2003.

See also

 List of Punahou School alumni
 List of Stanford University people

References

External links
 

1951 births
Living people
American male freestyle swimmers
Olympic swimmers of the United States
People from Eustis, Florida
Swimmers from Honolulu
Punahou School alumni
Stanford Cardinal men's swimmers
Swimmers at the 1968 Summer Olympics